Alexander Szelig (born 6 February 1966 in Werdau) is an East German-German bobsledder who competed in the early 1990s. Competing in three Winter Olympics, he won a gold medal in the four-man event with teammates Harald Czudaj, Karsten Brannasch and Olaf Hampel at Lillehammer in 1994.

Szelig also won three medals in the four-man event at the FIBT World Championships with one silver (1990 for East Germany) and two bronzes (1991, 1995, both for Germany).

References
Bobsleigh four-man Olympic medalists for 1924, 1932-56, and since 1964
Bobsleigh four-man world championship medalists since 1930
DatabaseOlympics.com profile

1966 births
Living people
People from Werdau
Bobsledders at the 1988 Winter Olympics
Bobsledders at the 1992 Winter Olympics
Bobsledders at the 1994 Winter Olympics
Bobsledders at the 1998 Winter Olympics
German male bobsledders
Olympic bobsledders of Germany
Olympic bobsledders of East Germany
Olympic gold medalists for Germany
Sportspeople from Saxony
Olympic medalists in bobsleigh
Medalists at the 1994 Winter Olympics